Churu district is a district of the Indian state of Rajasthan in northern India. It was founded by Banirot Rajputs. Some believe it was a village of jats known as kalera ka bas. Thakur Kushal Singh constructed the Churu fort in 1649 and during the battle of 1871 the area came under dominance of Bikaner State. The town of Churu is the administrative headquarters of the district.

Churu lies in the Bikaner region of northern Rajasthan and shares boundaries with the Hanumangarh District to the north, the Haryana state to the east, the Jhunjhunun and Sikar districts to the southeast, the Nagaur District to the south, and the Bikaner District to the west.

The district has an area of approximately 16,830 km2, with a road length of 1901 km. The 2011 population was approximately 2,039,547. The gender ratio is 938 females per 1,000 males; literacy among residents is 67.46%. There are 9 tehsils in the district: Churu, Rajaldesar,  Sidhmukh, Ratangarh, Taranagar, Rajgarh, Sardarshahar, Sujangarh, and Bidasar. Sardarshahar is the biggest Tehsil and Sidhmukh is the newest Tehsil Headquarter in Churu District . The major crops include bajra and guar.

Attractions
Sujangarh On South Side, Ratangarh On Southwest Side, Sardarshahar On North Side, Tarangar On Northeast Side, Rajgarh On East Side, Ratannagar, Chapper, Bidasar and Rajaldesar are the other major towns in the district. The Tal Chhapar Sanctuary, a blackbuck sanctuary, has more than 1,680 black bucks and migratory birds. It is a major attraction for wildlife enthusiasts. Other attractions include the grand palatial Havelies in the towns of Ratannagar, Ratangarh and Sardarshahar, the Hanuman temple at Salasar and the Venkateshwar temple at Sujangarh, the birthplace of local deity, Gogaji, in Dadrewa. The Bhadrakali Temple at Rajaldesar is popular among Shakta Tantra followers from all over India, which was established by Anant Shri Vibhushit Dandi Swami Jogendrashram ji Maharaj. Baba Phool Nath Temple at Nawa, Rajgarh is popular and related to the Nath community.

Demographics

According to the 2011 census, Churu district has a population of approximately 2,039,547, roughly equal to the nation of Botswana or the US state of New Mexico. This gives it a ranking of 224th in India (out of a total of 640 districts). Its population growth rate over the decade 2001-11 was approximately 6.1%. Churu has a sex ratio of 938 females for every 1000 males, and a literacy rate of about 67.46%. 28.25% of the population lives in urban areas. Scheduled Castes and Scheduled Tribes make up 22.15% and 0.55% of the population respectively.

Languages 

At the time of the 2011 census, 94.56% of the population spoke Rajasthani, 2.86% Marwari and 1.48% Hindi as their first language.

Percentage distribution of local work force
 Cultivators: 73.17%
 Agricultural labourers: 3.16%

Local industries
 Processing, servicing, and repairs: 2.26%
 Other workers: 21.41%

Major crop production
 Wheat: 60,654 tonnes
 Rapeseed and Mustard: 24,705 tonnes
 Pulses: 9,594 tonnes
 Gram: 316 tonnes
 Bajra: 2545467 tonnes

Communication facilities
 Public call offices: 682
 Post offices: 392
 Telegraph offices: 89
 Telephone exchanges: 83

Educational facilities and institutions
 Primary and middle schools: 1,472
 Secondary and higher secondary schools: 207
 Private BED Colleges: 14
 Post graduate and under graduate: 11
 ITIs: 5
 Government BED Colleges: 1
  IASE Deemed University
  Jawahar Navodaya Vidyalaya

Industrial scenario
 Large and Medium Scale Units: 10
 Small Scale Units: 3,963
 Industrial Areas: 7

Infrastructure
A majority of the district's power supply is provided by the Bhakra Hydel Complex through 132 kV lines coming via Hissar in Haryana. 902 of the district's 926 villages have access to electricity. Water is available at the depth of 30 to 48 metres, with the exception of places such as Sujangarh and Taranagar Tehsils.

The district has good connections within and outside the state. Mega Highway (Bathinda-Ajmer) National Highway Nos. 11 (Agra-Bikaner), 65 (Ambala-Pali), and 709 Ext. (Rohtak-Rajgarh) pass through the district. The total length of roads in the district is 3,010 km and is 240 km from Delhi via Hisar and 210 km. via Behal. The Churu district is served by broad gauge lines of the Northern-Western Railway. The total length of rail line is 363 km. The broad gauge is operational in the district. The nearest airport is at Jaipur (approximately 245 km outside the district).

Primary industries
 Aluminium utensils
 Blanket weaving
 Cement production
 Churan
 Chatni
 Guargum
 Hand loomed cloth
 Iron and steel fabrication
 Oil production
 Salt production
 Sewing machine (DABLA)

Notable people 

Khemchand Prakash- one of the best music composers of the 1940s.
 Nand Kishore Chaudhary - chairman and managing director of Jaipur Rugs and social entrepreneur.
 Lakshmi Mittal - the "Steel King", born at Sadulpur in Churu District.
 Bimal Jalan - former RBI governor
 Bharat Vyas - Writer of the prayer song, ‘Ae Malik Tere Bande Hum’ and 'Ye Kaun Chitrakar Hai'. He directed a Bollywood film Rangeela Rajasthani.
 Col. Thakur Kishan Singh Rathore - one of the first recipients of the Maha Vir Chakra (MVC) (second highest military decoration in India)
 Devendra Jhajharia - India's first Paralympic gold medalist.
 Kanhaiyalal Sethia- prominent Rajasthani writer.
 Rai Bahadur Bhagwandas Bagla- the first Marwari Shekhawati millionaire

See also
 Churu (Lok Sabha constituency)
 Gugalwa
 Ratangarh
 Ratannagar
 Sadulpur
 Sardarshahar
 Bidasar
 List of villages in Churu district
 Sujangarh
 Sandwa
 Tal Chhapar Sanctuary
 Rajaldesar
 Taranagar

References

External links 

 Churu District website

 
Districts of Rajasthan
Districts in Bikaner division